Rineloricaria henselii is a species of catfish in the family Loricariidae. It is native to South America, where it occurs in the Cubatão River in southern Santa Catarina in Brazil. The species reaches 7.5 cm (3 inches) in standard length and is believed to be a facultative air-breather.

References 

Loricariini
Fish described in 1907
Catfish of South America
Fish of Brazil